Through 1987, the College World Series was a pure double-elimination event. The format was changed in 1988, when the tournament was divided into two four-team double-elimination brackets, with the survivors of each bracket playing in a single championship game. The single-game championship was designed for network television, with the final game on CBS on Saturday afternoon.

In 2003, the tournament returned entirely to cable television on ESPN, which had been covering all of the other games of the CWS since 1982 (and a partial schedule since 1980). The championship final became a best-of-three series between the two bracket winners, with games scheduled for Saturday, Sunday, and Monday evenings. In the results shown here, Score indicates the score of the championship game(s) only.

The following is a list of the American television networks and announcers that have broadcast the College World Series.

Television by decade

2020s

2010s

2000s

1990s

1980s

Radio by decade

2020s

2010s

2000s

Basic television broadcaster overview
1980-1981 - ESPN (selected games of the CWS)
1982-1987 - ESPN (entire CWS)
1988-1990 - CBS (championship game); ESPN (remainder of CWS)
1991-2002 - CBS (championship game plus one game on first Saturday); ESPN (remainder of CWS)
2003–present - ESPN (entire CWS)

Note: ESPN aired some of these games on ESPN2

References

External links
The Road to Omaha: College Baseball
NCAA Men's College World Series 2010

CBS Sports
World Series broadcasters
broadcasters
College World Series
ESPN2
College World Series
College World Series broadcasters
World Series broadcasters